Alexander Joel is the name of:

 Alexander Joel (conductor) (born 1971), British classical pianist and conductor
 Alex Joel,  first American Civil Liberties Protection Officer for the U.S. Office of the Director of National Intelligence